Plumelin is a commune in the Morbihan department of Brittany in north-western France. Inhabitants of Plumelin are called in French Plumelinois.

Breton language
In 2008, there was 20.61% of the children attended the bilingual schools in primary education.

See also
Communes of the Morbihan department

References

External links

 Mayors of Morbihan Association 

Communes of Morbihan